Manje Bistre 2 is a 2019 Indian-Punjabi comedy film written by Gippy Grewal and directed by Baljit Singh Deo. It is the second installment of Manje Bistre series. Produced by Gippy Grewal under his banner Humble Motion Pictures; it stars Gippy Grewal and Simi Chahal in lead with Gurpreet Ghuggi, Karamjit Anmol, B.N. Sharma, and Sardar Sohi in supporting roles. The film revolves around Sukhi`s journey to Canada to attend his cousin’s marriage ceremony.

Cast 

 Gippy Grewal as Sukhi
 Simi Chahal as Rano
 Gurpreet Ghuggi as Maama
 Karamjit Anmol
 B.N. Sharma as Planner
 Sharik Khan
 Sardar Sohi
 Raghveer Boli as Kaleja
 Jaggi Singh as Gandaa

Soundtrack 

The music of songs have been composed by Jay K (Jassi Katyal), Gurmeet Singh and Soul Rockers. The 
score by Jatinder Shah. The lyrics are by Happy Raikoti and Ricky Khan.

Reception 
According to Box Office India, Manje Bistre 2 grossed ₹1.18 crore on its opening day in India making it the 21st highest Punjabi opener in India, while it was comparably very low to prequel Manje Bistre which grossed ₹2.21 crore on its opening day. In its opening weekend the film netted ₹4.12 crore in India and ₹5 crore at overseas including $415,000 from North America.

Sequel 
A sequel titled Manje bistre 3 is set for 2021 release.

References

External links 
 

Punjabi-language Indian films
2010s Punjabi-language films
Indian sequel films
Indian romantic comedy-drama films
Films directed by Baljit Singh Deo
2019 romantic comedy-drama films
Films scored by Gurmeet Singh
Films scored by Jassi Katyal
2019 comedy films
2019 films
2019 drama films